All of This – The "Live" Rarities is a live compilation album by British rock band New Model Army released in 1999 by EMI Records.  According to the album's cover these tracks are a compilation of New Model Army's finest and rarest live b-sides and extra tracks.

Track listing 
 "Vengeance" (Justin Sullivan) – 4:42
 recorded live at the Brixton Academy on 16 June 1990
 "Young Gifted and Skint" (Sullivan, Stuart Morrow) – 4:41
 recorded in Lyon, France, on 9 October 1985
 "A Liberal Education" (Sullivan, Morrow) – 6:26
 originally available on the bonus 12" with "51st State"
 "No Rest" (Sullivan, Morrow, Robert Heaton) – 6:14
 originally available on the bonus 12" with "51st State"
 "No Man's Land" (Sullivan) – 4:00
 originally available on the bonus 12" with "51st State"
 "My Country" (Sullivan, Morrow) – 3:48
 recorded live at Coventry Polytechnic in October 1986
 "All of This" (Sullivan, Heaton) – 3:42
 recorded live at The Ritz, New York City on 5 December 1986
 "Waiting" (Sullivan) – 4:11
 recorded live at Rock City, Nottingham on 20 April 1987 on the Manor Mobile by Steve Riddel
 "51st State" (Ashley Cartwright, New Model Army) – 2:29
 recorded live at Rock City, Nottingham on 20 April 1987 on the Manor Mobile by Steve Riddel
 "The Hunt" (Sullivan, Heaton) – 4:43
 recorded live at Rock City, Nottingham on 20 April 1987 on the Manor Mobile by Steve Riddel
 "125 MPH" (Sullivan, Heaton, Jason Harris) – 3:55
 recorded live at The Town & Country Club, London on 21 February 1989 by William Shapland
 "225" (Sullivan, Heaton) – 4:04
 recorded live on the "Impurity 90" tour of Europe
 "Ambition" (Sullivan) – 3:39
 recorded live on the "Impurity 90" tour of Europe
 "Betcha" (Sullivan, Morrow, Tompkins) – 3:44
 recorded live at the Bonn Biskuithalle on 25 October 1988

References 

 Discogs.com
 Official NMA website
 CD liner notes

New Model Army (band) live albums
1999 live albums
EMI Records live albums